Ruminococcus is a genus of bacteria in the class Clostridia. They are anaerobic, Gram-positive gut microbes. One or more species in this genus are found in significant numbers in the human gut microbiota. The type species is R. flavefaciens. As usual, bacteria taxonomy is in flux, with Clostridia being paraphyletic, and some erroneous members of Ruminococcus being reassigned to a new genus Blautia on the basis of 16S rRNA gene sequences.

One of the most highly cited papers involving the genus Ruminococcus is a paper describing interspecies hydrogen transfer between Ruminococcus albus and Wolinella succinogenes.

In 1972, Ruminococcus bromii was reportedly found in the human gut, which was the first of several species discovered. They may play a role in plant cell wall breakdown in the colon.

One study found that R. albus, R. callidus, and R. bromii are less abundant in people with inflammatory bowel disease. Ruminococcus are also less abundant in patients with Parkinson's disease and Amyotrophic lateral sclerosis. R. gnavus is associated with Crohn's disease.

Species 
 Ruminococcus albus
 Ruminococcus bromii
 Ruminococcus callidus
 Ruminococcus flavefaciens

Species belonging to the Lachnospiraceae family and therefore in need of reclassification:
 Ruminococcus gauvreauii
 Ruminococcus gnavus
 Ruminococcus lactaris
 Ruminococcus obeum
 Ruminococcus torques

References 

Eubacteriales
Gut flora bacteria